Vann may refer to:
 Salvadora oleoides is a small bushy evergreen tree found in India, Pakistan, and southern Iran
 Vann Peak, Marie Byrd Land, Antarctica

People with the name
 Vann (surname), an English surname (including a list of people with the surname)
 Vann McElroy (born 1960), former National Football League player
 Ho Vann, politician elected to the National Assembly of Cambodia in 2003
 Vann Molyvann (1926-2017), Cambodian architect
 John Paul Vann (1924-1972), U.S. civilian commander during the Vietnam War
 L. Vann Pettaway (born c. 1957), former men's basketball coach at Alabama Agricultural and Mechanical University
 C. Vann Woodward (1908–1999), American historian